Thuận Nam is a district (huyện) of Ninh Thuận province in the Southeast region of Vietnam.

History 
It was established on 10 June 2009 following Resolution 26/NQ-CP of the government of Vietnam on land that was previously part of Ninh Phước district.

Thuận Nam borders Ninh Sơn district in the west, Tuy Phong district of Bình Thuận province in the south, Ninh Phước district in the north and the South China Sea in the east.

Divisions 
Thuận Nam has 8 communes: 
Cà Ná
Phước Ninh 
Phước Diêm 
Phước Nam 
Phước Minh 
Phước Dinh 
Nhị Hà 
Phước Hà

Districts of Ninh Thuận province